The 1956–57 Ranji Trophy was the 23rd season of the Ranji Trophy. Bombay won the title defeating Services in the final.

Zonal Matches

West Zone

North Zone

South Zone

Central Zone

East Zone

Inter-Zonal Knockout matches

(T) – Advanced to final by spin of coin.

Final

Scorecards and averages
Cricketarchive

References

External links

1957 in Indian cricket
Ranji Trophy seasons